Dion Bennett (born 1 August 1974) is a New Zealand cricketer. He played in three first-class matches for Northern Districts in 1996/97.

See also
 List of Northern Districts representative cricketers

References

External links
 

1974 births
Living people
New Zealand cricketers
Northern Districts cricketers
Cricketers from Thames, New Zealand